A by-election was held for the Australian House of Representatives seat of East Sydney on 7 March 1931. This was triggered by the death of Labor MP John West.

The by-election was won by Labor candidate Eddie Ward, who was associated with New South Wales Premier Jack Lang's wing of the party.

This was the last by-election contested by the Nationalist Party as it would be replaced by the United Australia Party later that year.

Results

References

1931 elections in Australia
New South Wales federal by-elections